Steven Brett Guthrie (born February 18, 1964) is an American businessman and politician serving as the U.S. representative for . The district is in central Kentucky and includes Fort Knox, Owensboro, Bowling Green, and Danville. Guthrie previously served as a Republican member of the Kentucky Senate.

Early life, education, and career

Guthrie was born in Florence, Alabama, the son of Carolyn P. (née Holt) and Lowell M. Guthrie. He earned his Bachelor of Science in mathematical economics at the U.S. Military Academy at West Point in 1987 and his Master's of Public and Private Management at Yale University in 1997.

Guthrie is a former vice president of Trace Die Cast, Inc., an automotive parts supplier based in Bowling Green. He previously served as a field artillery officer in the 101st Airborne Division at Fort Campbell, Kentucky.

Kentucky Senate
Guthrie represented the 32nd district in the Kentucky Senate from 1999 to 2008, serving as vice chair of the Economic Development, Tourism and Labor Committee and chairing the Transportation Committee.

U.S. House of Representatives

Elections
2008

In the 2008 congressional general election, Guthrie defeated Democratic nominee State Senator David Boswell for the right to succeed the retiring U.S. Representative Ron Lewis. Lewis announced his retirement on the last day for candidates to file for the seat in 2008, in hopes of steering the Republican nomination to his chief of staff, Daniel London. Guthrie defeated London for the nomination.

This set up the closest race in the 2nd in 14 years. Democrats had a large advantage in registration, but voters had been very conservative on social issues. This was a major reason Lewis had been able to hold the district with little trouble since winning it in a 1994 special election. Guthrie prevailed by 15,500 votes, mostly on the strength of rural voters. He may have been boosted by voters being more motivated to come to the polls due to the presidential and Senate election held at the same time. Republican presidential nominee John McCain carried the district with 60% of the vote and won all but one county entirely within the district. Incumbent Republican Senator Mitch McConnell also carried the 2nd district easily.

2010

The 2nd reverted to form in 2010, and Guthrie defeated Democratic nominee Ed Marksberry by a large margin.

2012

Guthrie won reelection in 2012 with over 64% of the vote.

2018

Guthrie filed for reelection on November 27, 2017. Two Democratic challengers filed against Guthrie: Grant Short and Brian Pedigo, both of whom ultimately lost to Democratic candidate Hank Linderman in the primary.

Tenure

2011
In 2011, Guthrie voted for the National Defense Authorization Act for Fiscal Year 2012 as part of a controversial provision that allows the government and the military to indefinitely detain American citizens and others without trial. In July 2013, he voted against defunding the National Security Agency due to the alleged privacy violations reported by whistleblower Edward Snowden.

2013
Guthrie voted in favor of ending the United States federal government shutdown of 2013.

In September, Guthrie introduced the Missing Children's Assistance Reauthorization Act of 2013, authorizing the continued funding of the National Center for Missing and Exploited Children through fiscal year 2018 and to strengthen additional programs that prevent the abduction and sexual exploitation of children.

2017

Guthrie and Virginia Foxx introduced the Promoting Real Opportunity, Success and Prosperity through Education Reform (PROSPER) Act, an act that would eliminate Public Service Loan Forgiveness and reduce federal funding made available to for-profit colleges.

On December 19, Guthrie voted for the Tax Cuts and Jobs Act. Before his vote, he said he was "willing to accept" criticism about the bill making American businesses more competitive on a global scale.

2022

In August 2022, Guthrie criticized President Joe Biden for forgiving up to $10,000 of student loan debt for eligible borrowers. Guthrie was criticized for hypocrisy because he had $4.3 million of debt from his PPP loan forgiven.

Committee assignments
 Committee on Energy and Commerce
 Subcommittee on Digital Commerce and Consumer Protection
 Subcommittee on Communications and Technology
 Subcommittee on Health

Caucus memberships
 Congressional Arts Caucus
 Republican Study Committee
Climate Solutions Caucus
U.S.-Japan Caucus

Political positions

Interest group ratings

Guthrie has an "A" rating from the National Rifle Association for his gun rights voting record.

In 2016, Guthrie received a "D" rating from marijuana legalization advocacy group NORML for his voting record on cannabis-related causes.

Health care 

Guthrie supports the repeal and replacement of the Affordable Care Act ("Obamacare").

Abortion 

Guthrie opposes abortion. In 2008, Kentucky Right for Life endorsed him. He has a 100% rating from the National Right to Life Committee for his voting record on abortion-related matters.

Electoral history

Personal life
With his family, Guthrie attends the Lehman Avenue Church of Christ in Bowling Green, Kentucky. Michael Greene, former minister of the Lehman Avenue congregation, said he had no doubt "Guthrie's faith will play a positive role" in representing the 2nd district.

References

External links

 Congressman Brett Guthrie official U.S. House website
 Brett Guthrie for Congress
 
 
 

|-

1964 births
21st-century American politicians
American members of the Churches of Christ
Christians from Kentucky
Republican Party Kentucky state senators
Living people
Politicians from Bowling Green, Kentucky
Politicians from Florence, Alabama
Republican Party members of the United States House of Representatives from Kentucky
United States Army officers
United States Military Academy alumni
Yale University alumni